The 1992 International League season took place from April to September 1992.

The Columbus Clippers defeated the Scranton/Wilkes-Barre Red Barons to win the league championship. The 1992 Clippers were recognized on The National Baseball Association's top 100 minor league teams of all time list, placing at #72.

Attendance
Columbus Clippers - 613,416
Norfolk Tides - 180,493
Pawtucket Red Sox - 372,143
Richmond Braves - 453,915
Rochester Red Wings - 305,199
Scranton/Wilkes-Barre Red Barons - 598,067
Syracuse Chiefs - 277,113
Toledo Mud Hens - 254,666

Standings

Stats

Batting leaders

Pitching leaders

Regular season

Opening Day

All-Star game
The 1992 Triple-A All-Star Game was held at The Diamond in Richmond, Virginia, home of the IL's Richmond Braves. The All-Stars representing the American League affiliates won 2-1.  Sam Militello of the Columbus Clippers won the top award for the International League.

Playoffs

Division Series

Championship series

References

External links
International League official website 

 
International League seasons